A Tribute to the Cathedral Quartet is a CD/DVD released by Christian gospel quartet Ernie Haase & Signature Sound. The album is a tribute to the gospel group the Cathedral Quartet with whom tenor singer Haase performed from 1990 to 1999. This DVD video is the first to feature their new lead singer, Devin McGlamery and last to feature their bass singer, Tim Duncan. The album was released on October 25, 2010 by Spring House Music.

Awards

In 2011, the album was nominated for a Dove Award for Southern Gospel Album of the Year at the 42nd GMA Dove Awards, while the song "I Thirst" was nominated for Southern Gospel Recorded Song of the Year. The DVD version was also nominated for Long Form Music Video of the Year.

Track listing

 "Wedding Music" (Phil Cross, Kirk Talley) – 3:11
 "Step into the Water" (Kirk Talley) – 3:24
 "Boundless Love" (Dianne Wilkinson) – 3:38
 "I Thirst" (Beverly Lowry) – 3:16
 "This Ole House" (Stuart Hamblen) – 3:04
 "Champion of Love" (Carolyn Cross, Phil Cross) – 4:09
 "I'm Gonna Live Forever" (Shirley Cantrell) – 2:43
 "Can He, Could He, Would He" (John Chisum, Dwight Liles) – 2:31
 "Wonderful Grace of Jesus" (Haldor Lillenas) – 3:15
 "Sinner Saved by Grace" (Gloria Gaither, William J. Gaither, Mitch Humphries) – 4:54
 "An Old Convention Song" (Tim Lovelace, Roger Jerry Powell) – 2:28
 "Mexico" (Luverne Isbell) – 3:53
 "God Delivers Again" (Ronald Payne) – 3:11
 "Life Will Be Sweeter" (Public Domain) – 3:35
 "Moving Up to Gloryland" (Lee Roy Abernathy) – 2:55
 "Plan of Salvation" (Ruby Moody) – 4:03
 "We Shall See Jesus" (Dianne Wilkinson) – 5:02
 "Yesterday" (George Younce) – 3:49
 Gaither Medley: (Gloria Gaither, William J. Gaither) – 6:53
"Gentle Shepherd"
"There's Something About That Name"
"I Will Serve Thee"
"Jesus, We Just Want to Thank You" 

Bonus Tracks
 "Oh, What a Savior" (Live Version) (Marvin Dalton) – 5:10
 "He Made a Change" (Live Version) (Ernie Haase, Joel Lindsey) – 3:17

DVD track listing

 "Wedding Music"
 "Step Into the Water"
 "Boundless Love"
 "I’m Gonna Live Forever"
 "An Old Convention Song"
 "Oh, What a Savior"
 "Wonderful Grace of Jesus" (with Wayne Haun)
 "Sinner Saved by Grace"
 "Yesterday"
 "My Heart Is a Chapel"
 "Swinging on the Golden Gate"
 "Walk with Me" (with Bill Gaither)
 "Can He, Could He, Would He"
 "Mexico"
 "Sweet Beulah Land" (with Squire Parsons)
 "God Delivers Again"
 "He Made a Change"
 "Moving Up to Gloryland"
 "The Laughing Song"
 "I Thirst"
 "Champion of Love" (with Wayne Haun)
 "Plan of Salvation"
 "We Shall See Jesus" (with Glen Payne)
 "This Ole House"
 "Life Will Be Sweeter Someday" (Bonus)

References

External links
A Tribute to the Cathedral Quartet on Amazon.com

2010 albums